Selin may refer to:

Places 
 Selin, Iran, a village

Given name 
 Selin Demiratar (born 1983), Turkish actress
 Selin Dişli (born 1998), Turkish footballer
 Selin Ekiz (born 1989), Turkish basketball player
 Selin Kuralay (born 1985), Australian footballer
 Selin Sayek Böke (born 1972), Turkish politician
 Selin Sivrikaya (born 1997), Turkish footballer
 Selin Şahin (born 1992), Turkish wheelchair basketball player

Surname 
 Aleksei Selin (born 1978), Russian football player
 Ari-Pekka Selin (born 1963), Finnish ice hockey player and coach
 Christian Selin (born 1976), Finnish racing cyclist
 Erik Selin (born 1967), Swedish businessman
 Erika Selin (born 1991), Swedish singer
 Eva Selin Lindgren (1936–2011), Swedish politician and physicist
 Fyodor Selin (1899–1960), Soviet football player and coach
 Helaine Selin (born 1946), American librarian and author
 Ivan Selin (born 1937), American businessman
 Maria Selin (born 1977), Finnish ice hockey player
 Markus Selin (born 1960), Finnish television and film producer
 Markus Selin (born 1978), Swedish politician
 Patrik Selin, Swedish businessman
 Sebastian Selin (born 1992), Swedish ice hockey player
 Victor Șelin (born 1965), Moldovan businessman and politician
 Yevhen Selin (born 1988), Ukrainian footballer

See also
 Celin
 Selina
 Seline (disambiguation)
 Sellin (disambiguation)
 Selen (disambiguation)
 Silen (disambiguation)